Lee-James Edjouma (born 18 November 1982), better known by his stage name James BKS, is a French lyricist, a music composer and a producer of African hip hop.

Career

Early career
Born in Paris in 1982, Edjouma's career started out in the US when he signed on Akon's label Konvict Muzik. It was around this time that he was working with famous artists such as R. City, T-Pain, and producing for Sean Combs, Snoop Dogg, Ja Rule, and Booba. He then decided to return to France to focus on his personal project.

Music
He is currently signed to Idris Elba’s London-based label, 7Wallace. He released three singles on the label, featuring Allan Kingdom, Reo Cragun, Ebenezer, Idris Elba, Q-Tip (A Tribe Called Quest), Little Simz and his father Manu Dibango.
He also co-founded his own record label and music production company, Grown Kid, with his wife. His music has been aired several times on international radios most notably being playlisted on Annie Mac’s radio show on BBC 1Xtra.

James BKS is also a composer of original scores for feature films and advertisement.

Live
James BKS started performing live in late 2019 in Paris, showcasing his live performance for the first time at La Petite Halle de la Villette. He also performed for the Africa Day event on MTV Base Africa and for Arte Concert

He also performed live before the AFCON finals.

Personal life
Edjouma is the son of famous Cameroonian musician Manu Dibango.

Discography

Compositions 

 2008 : Petit Nègre - Al Peco
 2008 : 100 barres - Al Peco
 2008 : King - Booba
 2009 : Groove On - Timati (feat. Snoop Dogg)
 2010 : Plus Que De La Musique - Sat L’Artificier (feat. Akhenaton, Soprano)
 2011 : I'm On You - Timati (feat. P. Diddy)
 2012 : Party Animal - Timati
 2012 : Pain Is Love - Ja Rule
 2012 : To The Top - Ja Rule (feat. Kalenna)
 2012 : Requiem - Sadek
 2012 : Mecs du Hood - Zoxea
 2013 : Retrofuturflow - Ol Kainry (feat. Youssoupha)
 2013 : Pas Besoin - Kamelancien (feat. Atheena)
 2016 : Tu sais - Christophe Willem, Black M, Inna Modja, Manu Dibango
 2017 : Art Contemporain (album) - Les Sages Poètes de la Rue

Soundtracks
 2014 : Une Histoire Banale directed by Audrey Estrougo 
 2015 : La Taularde, directed by Julie Gayet
 2016 : Le Gang Des Antillais directed by Jean-Claude Barny

Singles 
 2018 : Kwele (feat. Allan Kingdom, Manu Dibango)
 2018 : MaWakanda (feat. Reo Cragun, Ebenezer)
 2019 : New Breed (feat. Q-Tip, Idris Elba, Little Simz)

References

Living people
1982 births
21st-century French singers
21st-century French musicians
French people of Cameroonian descent
Musicians from Paris